Super D1, is the top division of the Football Federation of the Islamic Republic of Mauritania.  It was created in 1976.

Current clubs (2021–22)

Previous winners

1976: AS Garde Nationale (Nouakchott)
1977: AS Garde Nationale (Nouakchott)
1978: AS Garde Nationale (Nouakchott)
1979: AS Garde Nationale (Nouakchott)
1980: no championship
1981: ASC Police (Nouakchott)
1982: ASC Police (Nouakchott)
1983: ACS Ksar (Nouakchott)
1984: AS Garde Nationale (Nouakchott)
1985: ACS Ksar (Nouakchott)
1986: ASC Police (Nouakchott)
1987: ASC Police (Nouakchott)
1988: ASC Police (Nouakchott)
1989: no championship
1990: ASC Police (Nouakchott)
1991: ASC Police (Nouakchott)
1992: ASC Sonader Ksar (Nouakchott)
1993: ASC Sonader Ksar (Nouakchott)
1994: AS Garde Nationale (Nouakchott)
1995: ASC Sonalec (Nouakchott)
1996: no championship
1997: no championship
1998: AS Garde Nationale (Nouakchott)
1999: SDPA Trarza FC (Rosso)
2000: ASC Mauritel Mobile FC (Nouakchott)
2001: FC Nouadhibou (Nouadhibou)
2002: FC Nouadhibou (Nouadhibou)
2003: ASC Nasr de Sebkha (Nouakchott)
2004: ACS Ksar (Nouakchott)
2005: ASC Nasr de Sebkha (Nouakchott)
2005–06: ASC Mauritel Mobile FC (Nouakchott)
2006–07: ASC Nasr de Sebkha (Nouakchott)
2007–08: ASAC Concorde (Nouakchott)
2009: CF Cansado (Nouadhibou)
2010: CF Cansado (Nouadhibou)
2010–11: FC Nouadhibou (Nouadhibou)
2011–12: FC Tevragh-Zeina (Nouakchott)
2012–13: FC Nouadhibou (Nouadhibou)
2013–14: FC Nouadhibou (Nouadhibou)
2014–15: FC Tevragh-Zeina (Nouakchott)
2015–16: FC Tevragh-Zeina (Nouakchott)
2016–17: ASAC Concorde (Nouakchott)
2017–18: FC Nouadhibou (Nouadhibou)
2018–19: FC Nouadhibou (Nouadhibou)
2019–20: FC Nouadhibou (Nouadhibou)
2020–21: FC Nouadhibou (Nouadhibou)
2021–22: FC Nouadhibou (Nouadhibou)

Performance By Club

Top scorers

Hat-tricks

See also
 Mauritanian Cup
 Mauritanian Super Cup

External links
FFRIM D1 Calendar
RSSSF competition history
https://www.ffrim.org/

Super D1
Football competitions in Mauritania
Mauritania